Affiliated Foods Midwest was a retailers' cooperative based in Norfolk, Nebraska, Elwood, Kansas and Kenosha, Wisconsin, serving the states of Oklahoma, Kansas, Colorado, Wyoming, Nebraska, Missouri, Illinois, Wisconsin, Iowa, South Dakota, North Dakota, Minnesota, Arizona, Arkansas, Kentucky and Michigan.  It distributed Shurfine products, and was affiliated with IGA (supermarkets).

It was founded in 1931 in Plainview, Nebraska, it took the name General Wholesale in 1936, and the name Affiliated Foods in 1977.  In 2016, it merged with Associated Wholesale Grocers (AWG); the combined entity operates under AWG name.

References

Doniphan County, Kansas
Pierce County, Nebraska
Madison County, Nebraska
Companies based in Kansas
Companies based in Nebraska
American companies established in 1931
Retail companies established in 1931
Economy of the Midwestern United States
Supermarkets of the United States
Retailers' cooperatives in the United States
1931 establishments in Kansas